Las Aventuras de Oliver Twist is a 1987 Spanish-language animated film directed by Fernando Ruiz. It is based on the 1838 novel Oliver Twist by Charles Dickens.

Voice cast 
Rocio Garcel – Oliver
Lilia Sixtos – Nancy
Juan A. Edwards - Truhar
Yamil Atala – Sweble
Rocio Prado – Villi Kent and Susana
Patricia Acevedo – Michele and Rosa
Eduardo Liñán – Bill Sikes
Juan Domingo – Fagin and Bumble
Alvaro Tarcicio – Tuck
Narciso Busquets – Brownlow
Velia Vegar – Bedwin
Jorge Roig – Mortimer
Esteban Siller – Lesborne
Carmen Donadio – Pani Mann
Liza Willert – Sally and Dama
Emilio Querrero – Limbkins
Armando Rendis – Rossi
Monica Elizabeth – Polly
Ana Maria Grey – Oliver's mother
Carlos Segunto – Mesero
Eduardo Borja – Caballero
Fernando Ruiz – Cosinero
Arturo Casanova – Policia
J. Manuel Rosano - Narrador

External links 
Las aventuras de Oliver Twist (1987) – IMDb

Mexican animated films
Films based on Oliver Twist
1987 animated films
1987 films
1980s Mexican films